Le Vibrazioni (English: The Vibrations) is an Italian rock and pop band formed in Milan in 1999. They made their breakthrough in 2003 with their debut single Dedicato a te ("Dedicated to you"), which went platinum in Italy. All their albums have been released on BMG.

Biography 
The four founding members, all born in Milan or its metropolitan area, are Francesco Sarcina (guitar and vocals), Stefano Verderi (guitar and keyboards), Marco Castellani (bass), and Alessandro Deidda (drums). After many years spent playing in clubs around Milan, the group signed with BMG and debuted with the single Dedicato a te, which topped the Italian charts and became one of 2003 best-selling singles. Later in the same year they published their first album, 'Le Vibrazioni', whose sales exceeded 300,000 copies and from which the singles In una notte d'estate, Vieni da me, Sono più sereno and ...E se ne va were extracted. ...E se ne va would later be included in the soundtrack of Luca Lucini's film Tre metri sopra il cielo (2004). The music video for Dedicato a te was subsequently spoofed by Elio e le Storie Tese in their song Shpalman. In 2008 Emanuele Gardossi replaced Marco Castellani on bass. Castellani would later rejoin the band in 2017.

The band participated at the Sanremo Music Festival 2020 with the song "Dov'è".

Members 
Francesco Sarcina – singer, guitar (1999–present)
Stefano Verderi – guitar, keyboard, sitar (1999–present)
Marco Castellani – bass guitar (1999–2008, 2012, 2017–present)
Alessandro Deidda – drums (1999–present)

Former members 
Emanuele Gardossi – bass guitar (2008–2012)

Discography

Albums 
 Le Vibrazioni (2003)
 Le Vibrazioni II (2005)
 Officine Meccaniche (2006)
 En Vivo (2008)
 Le Strade Del Tempo (2010)
 V (2018)

Singles 
2003 – Dedicato a te (ITA #1) / Video
2003 – In una notte d'estate / Video
2003 – E se ne va / Video
2003 – Vieni da me / Video
2004 – Sono più sereno / Video
2005 – Raggio di sole (ITA #3) / Video
2005 – Ovunque andrò / Video
2005 – Angelica
2005 – Aspettando / Video
2005 – Ogni giorno ad ogni ora / Video
2006 – Fermi senza forma (online only, on the website MtvOverdrive) / Video
2006 – Se / Video
2007 – Portami via / Video
2007 – Dimmi / Video
2008 – Drammaturgia / Video
2008 – Insolita / Video
2008 – Su un altro pianeta / Video
2010 – Respiro / Video
2010 – Senza indugio / Single
2010 – Invocazioni al cielo / Video
2011 – Come far nascere un fiore / Single
2012 – Il sangue e anche il resto / Single
2018 – Così sbagliato / Single

DVDs 
 Live all'Alcatraz (2004)
 Le Vibrazioni II (Dual Disc) (2005)
 En Vivo (2008)

References

External links 
 
 

Musical groups established in 1999
Italian pop music groups
Italian rock music groups
Musical groups from Milan
1999 establishments in Italy